Richard Stuart Walker (born 17 September 1980) is an English former footballer who played as a defender. In an eleven-year career he played 185 competitive games, including 158 appearances in the English Football League.

He spent most of his career with Crewe Alexandra, and played over 100 games for the club between 1999 and 2006. During this time he also played on loan for non-league clubs Northwich Victoria and Halesowen Town. He joined Port Vale in 2006, and was loaned out to Wrexham in 2007. In 2008, he signed with Macclesfield Town, before transferring to non-league Hednesford Town the following year. He left the club in January 2010.

Playing career

Crewe Alexandra
Born in Stafford, Staffordshire, Walker attended Wolgarston High School in Penkridge, playing for Penkridge Juniors until signing for Crewe Alexandra at age fourteen. After working his way through the ranks to the first team, he made over 100 appearances for the "Railwaymen" in seven years, making his debut in November 2000 as a 20-year-old. Before making his professional bow, he had been sent out on loan to local non-league side Northwich Victoria to gain first team experience, making ten appearances at the Drill Field during a six-month loan during the 1999–2000 season.

The following season, he made only a handful of appearances for Crewe, and was farmed out on loan to Southern League Halesowen Town for a month in March 2001 for more first team games.

The 2001–02 season saw Walker make only one substitute appearance for Crewe, though he was still offered a new two-year deal. The following season saw him become a virtual ever-present at Gresty Road as the club won promotion from the Second Division in 2002–03. He agreed a new three-year deal in June 2003, keeping him at Crewe until the summer of 2006. The next two years saw Walker continue to play regular football. He was not offered a new contract by Crewe at the end of the 2005–06 season, and instead joined near neighbours Port Vale on a free transfer in June 2006.

Port Vale
Despite a good start to his time at Vale Park, which included a goal in the League Cup against Championship side Queens Park Rangers, he faded from the first team picture and was loaned to struggling League Two side Wrexham in March 2007. His form for the "Dragons" in just three appearances impressed to the extent that Liverpool striker Craig Bellamy added money to the pot collected to pay the defender whilst at the Racecourse Ground. He returned to Vale Park in the summer, but was a peripheral figure during the 2007–08 season, and was released in January 2008 after suffering problems with tendinitis in his knee. After a short spell training with Shrewsbury Town and turning out for their reserves, he joined Macclesfield Town on a short-term deal in March 2008.

Later career
His form in his ten games impressed manager Keith Alexander sufficiently to win Walker a twelve-month contract in June 2008. He turned out sixteen times for the "Silkmen" in 2008–09, playing against Premier League Everton in the FA Cup Third Round in January 2009. With his contract coming to an end at Moss Rose in May 2009, he made contact with Hednesford Town manager Dean Edwards, who was in the market for an experienced player to become part of the coaching staff at Keys Park after Matt Elliott's departure. Despite his relative young age and Football League background, he decided to take the step down to Southern League Premier Division and join the "Pitmen" as the club's new first team coach. However he left the club by mutual consent in January 2010.

Coaching career
In July 2009 he was appointed the under-11's coach at Stoke City on a part-time basis. He was made Stoke City U18s manager for the 2018–19 season.

Career statistics

Honours
Crewe Alexandra
Football League Second Division second-place promotion: 2002–03

References

External links

1980 births
Sportspeople from Stafford
Living people
English footballers
Association football defenders
Crewe Alexandra F.C. players
Port Vale F.C. players
Northwich Victoria F.C. players
Halesowen Town F.C. players
Wrexham A.F.C. players
Macclesfield Town F.C. players
Hednesford Town F.C. players
National League (English football) players
English Football League players
Southern Football League players
Association football coaches
Stoke City F.C. non-playing staff